The 1990 FEI World Equestrian Games were held in Stockholm, Sweden from July 24 to August 5, 1990. They were the first edition of the games which are held every four years and run by the FEI.

Events
13 events in 6 disciplines were held in Stockholm.

Medal summary

Medalists

Medal count

External links
The event at SVT's open archive 

FEI World Equestrian Games
FEI World Equestrian Games
International sports competitions in Stockholm
1990 in Swedish sport
1990s in Stockholm
Equestrian sports competitions in Sweden
July 1990 sports events in Europe
August 1990 sports events in Europe
Horse driving competition